Dactylorhiza hatagirea is a species of orchid generally found growing in the Himalayas, from Pakistan to SE Tibet, at altitudes of . It is locally called 'salam panja' or 'hatta haddi'. It is called 'panchaule' (पाँचऔंले) in Nepali and Himalayan regions. The name 'panchaule' (meaning 5 fingered hand) arises from its root resembling fingers of hand with around 3-5 fingers. It is an erect perennial herb with long flowering stems. The plant is well known for its medicinal value. The root has sweet taste. It is strictly prohibited for collection and sale, but can be found easily around Nepal. It costs around NRs. 10,000-15,000 per kilo as of late 2015.

Uses
The juice extracted from tuber is used as a tonic and also used for the treatment of pyorrhea (inflammation of the gum and teeth). Root paste is externally applied as a poultice on cuts and wounds and extract is given in intestinal disorders. The term hatta haddi means a root(jadi) resembling a hand (hatta or hath).

Habitat
As it is highly traded in the name of 'panchaule' or 'salampanja' and found in wild, is being unscientifically collected for its commercial importance. Dactylorhiza hatagirea is native of the Himalaya. It is found throughout from west to east at temperate to subalpine biocliates within 2800 – 4000 m altitude. Flowers spotted rosy-purple in a terminal spike, borne on a robust leafy stem. It has palmately lobed root tubers, grows well in moist places, open areas, shrub land and open meadows.

Endangered
Dactylorhiza hatagirea is endemic to the Hindu- Kush Himalaya. It is categorized as endangered in CAMP Pokhara (2001) conservation list, and strictly banned for collection, utilization and sale (strictly protected species list I GoN, 2001, 2005), and listed in appendix II for control trading (CITES – 1974). Flowers in June–July. Roots are tuberous, divided into 2 or 3 lobes.

References

External links

hatagirea
Flora of Nepal
Flora of Pakistan
Flora of Tibet
Orchids of China
Plants described in 1825